The 1946 New Zealand general election was a nationwide vote to determine the shape of the New Zealand Parliament's 28th term. It saw the governing Labour Party re-elected, but by a substantially narrower margin than in the three previous elections. The National Party continued its gradual rise.

Background
The Labour Party had been in government since winning the 1935 elections, and had been re-elected twice. However, the National Party had managed to overcome the internal problems which had once troubled it, and now presented a credible threat to Labour. National's leader, Sidney Holland, was proving more effective than his predecessor, while the Prime Minister, Peter Fraser, was weary and in poor health. The after-effects of World War II, including ongoing shortages, were affecting the government's popularity.

The next New Zealand census was scheduled for 1946, but having had to postpone the 1941 census due to WWII, the government brought it forward. The 1945 census was held on Tuesday, 25 September, so that the results could be used for the 1946 electoral redistribution prior to the planned 1946 election. In August 1945, there was a first hint that the government considered abolishing the country quota through the Electoral Amendment Act, 1945. The amendment bill was introduced on 18 October 1945 and proposed the complete abolition of the country quota and that electorates be based on adult, as opposed to total, population. The Electoral Amendment Act, 1945 was given royal assent on 12 November and it reduced the number and increased the size of rural electorates. None of the existing electorates remained unchanged, 26 electorates were abolished, 19 electorates were created for the first time, and six former electorates were re-established. The 1946 electoral redistribution had to take ten years of population growth and movements into account. The North Island gained a further two electorates from the South Island due to faster population growth.

MPs retiring in 1946
Five Labour MPs and one National MP intended to retire at the end of the Parliament.

Date of election
The election should have been held earlier. The 27th parliament "forgot to mark the calendar, forgot the previous election had been earlier than usual and accidentally ran for two extra months".

The election
The date for the main 1946 elections was 27 November, a Wednesday. Elections to the four Māori electorates were held the day before. 1,081,898 people were registered to vote, and there was a turnout of 93.5%. This turnout was the highest ever recorded at this point. The number of seats being contested was 80, a number which had been fixed since 1902.

Election results

Party standings
The 1946 election saw the governing Labour Party retain office by a four-seat margin, winning forty-two seats to the National Party's thirty-eight. In the popular vote — Labour won 51.3% and National won 48.4%. The election was a straight fight between the two main parties (unlike the ), and only 8 of the 76 European electorates had more than two candidates. The Democratic Labour Party did not take part, and National absorbed many of the miscellaneous candidates and splinter movements. The European electorates divided equally and the Maori seats decided the issue. 

No other parties won any significant share of the vote, and no independents were elected — only 0.3% of voters did not support one of the two major parties. After Harry Atmore of Nelson died, no candidate who was not from the two main parties managed to enter Parliament until the 1966 elections, when the Social Credit Party won its first seat.

Votes summary

Initial MPs

The table below shows the results of the 1946 general election:

Key

|-
 |colspan=8 style="background-color:#FFDEAD" | General electorates
|-

|-
 | Hauraki
 | style="background-color:;" |
 | colspan=3 style="text-align:center;background-color:;" | Andy Sutherland
 | style="text-align:right;" | 2,891
 | style="background-color:;" |
 | style="text-align:center;" | John William Neate
|-

|-
 |colspan=8 style="background-color:#FFDEAD" | Māori electorates
|-

|}
Table footnotes:

Notes

References

 
November 1946 events in New Zealand